Marshall Park may refer to:
 Marshall Park (Charlotte, North Carolina)
 Marshall Park, Portland, Oregon, a neighborhood in Portland, Oregon
 Marshall Park (Seattle, Washington)
 Marshall Park, Ontario, a neighbourhood in the city of North Bay, Ontario, Canada

See also
Marshall M. Parks (1918–2005), an American ophthalmologist
Marshall Parker (1922–2008), an American politician
Marshalls Park Academy, a secondary school in Romford, London, England